Jean Chateau (11 December 1926 – 26 May 2018) was a French racing cyclist. He rode in the 1951 Tour de France.

References

External links
 

1926 births
2018 deaths
French male cyclists
Cyclists from Paris